Chilwell may refer to:

People
 Ben Chilwell (born 1996), English footballer

Places
 Chilwell, a village and residential suburb of Nottingham, England
 Chilwell, a suburb of Newtown, Victoria, Australia

Other uses

See also